Hangzhou–Huangshan high-speed railway or Hanghuang HSR is a dual-track, electrified, high-speed rail line between Hangzhou, Zhejiang, and Huangshan, Anhui. Travel time from Hangzhou to Huangshan was reduced to about one and one-half hours. The line is the first rail link between the two cities and brings counties in mountainous southern Anhui closer to the Yangtze River Delta region. Construction began on June 30, 2014, and the line opened on December 25, 2018.

Route
The high-speed rail line connects southern Anhui Province with Hangzhou, on the eastern seaboard, via northwestern Zhejiang province. Cities and counties along the route include Hangzhou, Xiaoshan, Fuyang, Tonglu, Jiande, Chun'an in Zhejiang, and Jixi, She County, and Huangshan in Anhui. At its eastern terminus, Hangzhou, the line is linked to the high-speed rail lines to Shanghai and Nanjing.  At its western terminus, Huangshan, the line connects to the Hefei–Fuzhou high-speed railway. Scenic sites along route include Huangshan (Yellow Mountain), the ancient villages in southern Anhui, Qiandao Lake, and Hangzhou.

History
The Hanghuang high-speed rail project was initially approved by the State Development and Planning Commission in July 2010. Construction was to begin later in that year and was scheduled to be completed by as early as 2013. After two rounds of environmental assessments of surveys in 2010 and 2011, the project was revised. Two stations, Shexian South and Sanyang, were added to the original plan, which had Hangzhou East, Hangzhou South, Fuyang, Tonglu, Jiande, Chun'an, Jixi North, and Huangshan North. The Jiande-to-Jixi section of the line would use seamless steel rails laid on a concrete rail bed. The Hangzhou South-to-Jiande and Jixi-to-Huangshan sections would have rail laid on conventional gravel beds. Construction began on June 30, 2014, and the line was opened on December 25, 2018.

References

High-speed railway lines in China
Rail transport in Anhui
Rail transport in Zhejiang
Railway lines opened in 2018
25 kV AC railway electrification